Sayer Nunatak is a rocky peak rising to 210 m south of Williams Point on Varna Peninsula, at the north edge of the ice cap of Livingston Island in the South Shetland Islands, Antarctica.  The nunatak is forming the north extremity of Vidin Heights and surmounting Dragon Cove to the northeast, Griffin Cove to the north-northwest and Charybdis Cove to the southwest.

The feature is named after the American Captain Sayer, Master of the brig General Scott, who carried out sealing operations in this area in 1821–22.

Location

See also
 Vidin Heights
 Varna Peninsula
 Livingston Island

Maps
 L.L. Ivanov et al. Antarctica: Livingston Island and Greenwich Island, South Shetland Islands. Scale 1:100000 topographic map. Sofia: Antarctic Place-names Commission of Bulgaria, 2005.
 L.L. Ivanov. Antarctica: Livingston Island and Greenwich, Robert, Snow and Smith Islands. Scale 1:120000 topographic map.  Troyan: Manfred Wörner Foundation, 2009.  
 Antarctic Digital Database (ADD). Scale 1:250000 topographic map of Antarctica. Scientific Committee on Antarctic Research (SCAR). Since 1993, regularly updated.
 L.L. Ivanov. Antarctica: Livingston Island and Smith Island. Scale 1:100000 topographic map. Manfred Wörner Foundation, 2017.

References
 Sayer Nunatak. SCAR Composite Antarctic Gazetteer
 

Nunataks of Livingston Island